Eotaphrosphys is an extinct genus of bothremydid pleurodiran turtle that was discovered in the Mont Aime Formation, France. Originally assigned to the genus "Tretosternum", it consists exclusively of type species E. ambiguum.

Discovery 
Eotaphrosphys was described in 1890 by Jean Albert Gaudry, under the initial name of "Tretosternum" ambiguum. It was subsequently redescribed and given the name "Taphrosphys" ambiguum, and was redescribed once again in 2018 and assigned the name Eotaphrosophys.

References 

Bothremydidae
Prehistoric turtle genera
Late Cretaceous turtles
Fossils of France
Maastrichtian life
Cretaceous Europe
Fossil taxa described in 1890
Monotypic turtle genera